The 2011–12 season was the 114th in the history of Standard Liège and their 92nd consecutive season in the top flight. The club participated in the Belgian Pro League, the Belgian Cup, UEFA Champions League, and UEFA Europa League.

Players

Transfers

In

Out

Pre-season and friendlies

Competitions

Overall record

Belgian Pro League

Regular season

Matches

Championship playoff

Belgian Cup

UEFA Champions League

Third qualifying round

UEFA Europa League

Play-off round

Group stage

Knockout phase

Round of 32

Round of 16

References 

Standard Liège seasons
Standard Liege